Achille Piccini (24 October 1911 – 14 February 1995) was an Italian footballer who competed in the 1936 Summer Olympics. A native of Carrara, Piccini played as a midfielder or as a defender.

Career
Piccini played for several Italian clubs throughout his career, including Fiorentina, Carrarese, Bari and Napoli. Piccini was also a member of the Italian team which won the gold medal in the football tournament of the 1936 Summer Olympics held in Berlin.

Honours

International 
Italy
Olympic Gold Medal: 1936

References

External links
 
 
 
 The forgotten story of ... football, farce and fascism at the 1936 Olympics

1911 births
1995 deaths
People from Carrara
Italian footballers
Footballers at the 1936 Summer Olympics
Olympic footballers of Italy
Olympic gold medalists for Italy
Italy international footballers
Olympic medalists in football
Medalists at the 1936 Summer Olympics
Association football defenders
Serie A players
Carrarese Calcio players
A.C. Prato players
ACF Fiorentina players
S.S.C. Bari players
S.S.D. Lucchese 1905 players
S.S.C. Napoli players
U.S. Ancona 1905 players
Sportspeople from the Province of Massa-Carrara
Footballers from Tuscany